New Destinies, Vol. VI/Winter 1988—Robert A. Heinlein Memorial Issue, edited by Jim Baen, (Baen Books).

This issue of The Paperback Magazine of Science Fiction and Speculative Fact was published after the death of Robert A. Heinlein earlier that year. It contains a few of his stories, several tributes, and two poems of his that were never published before. Additionally there are other short stories by several writers.

The table of contents:

 "In Appreciation: Robert A. Heinlein" by Jerry Pournelle
 "The Long Watch" by Robert A. Heinlein
 "Dance Session": poem by Robert A. Heinlein
 "Rah Rah R.A.H." by Spider Robinson
 Excerpts from The Notebooks of Lazarus Long by Robert A. Heinlein
 "Robert A. Heinlein and the Coming Age of Space" by Rick Cook
 More Excerpts from The Notebooks of Lazarus Long by Robert A. Heinlein
 "The Man Who Traveled in Elephants" by Robert A. Heinlein (Heinlein's favorite story)
 "Farewell to the Master" by Dr. Yoji Kondo and Dr. Charles Sheffield
 "The Witch's Daughters": poem by Robert A. Heinlein

Other stories:

 "Copyright Violation" by Spider Robinson
 "The Blabber" by Vernor Vinge
 "Counting Up": essay by Charles Sheffield
 "Megaphone" by Rick Cook
 "Freeze Frame" by John Moore
 "King of All" by Harry Turtledove

External links 
 

1988 books
Science fiction anthologies
Works by Robert A. Heinlein
Baen Books books